Joseph Lee Phelps (August 12, 1899 – March 15, 1983) was a farmer and political figure in Saskatchewan. He represented Saltcoats from 1938 to 1948 in the Legislative Assembly of Saskatchewan as a Co-operative Commonwealth Federation (CCF) member.

He was born in Belleville, Ontario and came west with his family in 1908, settling on a homestead near Wilkie, Saskatchewan. In 1918, he became a district director for the Saskatchewan Grain Growers' Association. In 1928, he participated in the convention where the United Farmers of Canada was formed. Phelps was a founding member of the Farmer-Labour party. He served in the provincial cabinet as Minister of Natural Resources and Industrial Development. Phelps was defeated when he ran for reelection to the assembly in 1948. In 1949, he helped rebuild the United Farmers of Canada into the Saskatchewan Farmers Union, serving as its president from 1949 to 1954.

Phelps helped establish the Western Development Museum, as well as museums in Yorkton, Saskatoon and North Battleford.

In 1982, he was named to the Saskatchewan Agricultural Hall of Fame.

References 

Saskatchewan Co-operative Commonwealth Federation MLAs
20th-century Canadian politicians
1899 births
1983 deaths